Leedham is a surname. Notable people with the surname include:

 Johannah Leedham (born 1987), British basketballer
 John Leedham (born 1928), Australian footballer
 Michael Leedham (born 1950), Australian cricketer

See also
 Leedham Bantock (1870–1928), British singer, actor, and screenwriter
 Charles Leedham-Green